Normandina is a genus of lichen-forming fungi in the family Verrucariaceae. It has three species:

Normandina acroglypta 
Normandina pulchella 
Normandina simodensis 

The type species of the genus, Normandina jungermanniae, is now considered synonymous with Normandina pulchella.

Lauderlindsaya is a genus that was proposed by David and Hawksworth in 1989 to contain the lichenicolous fungus Sphaerulina chlorococca, which was thought to grow parasitically on Normandina pulchella. Later research showed that Lauderlindsaya represents the fertile form of Normandina, and the former name was subsumed into the latter.

References

Verrucariales
Lichen genera
Eurotiomycetes genera
Taxa named by William Nylander (botanist)
Taxa described in 1855